The 1958 Pacific hurricane season saw thirteen tropical systems. It officially started on May 15, 1958, in the eastern Pacific and lasted until November 30, 1958.

Systems

Hurricane One

On June 14, a tropical storm hit southern Mexico.

Tropical Storm Two

Tropical Storm Two existed from June 13 to June 15.

Hurricane Three

Hurricane Three existed from July 19 to July 21.  Hurricane Three was of full hurricane strength when located on the 19th at 18N 129W by observations taken on the WAITEMATA.  It traveled directly westward to about 18N 139W on the 21st.

Hurricane Four

Hurricane Four existed from July 21 to July 25.  A tropical storm built up at 19N 125W.  This tropical storm moved westward and northwestward from the 21st.  It became a hurricane on the 23rd near 19N 132W but only for a day.  It continued northwestward to about 24N 136W on the 25th then degenerated to a squally area

Tropical Storm Five

Tropical Storm Five existed from July 26 to July 30.  A tropical storm about 140 mi. west of Acapulco, Mexico was located in the 26th.  This storm had winds of 45 to 55 kt. from the time if its identification until the 29th.  It moved northwestward off the coast of Mexico finally breaking up into an area of squalls near 26N 117W on the 30th.

Tropical Storm Six

Tropical Storm Six existed from July 31 to August 1.

Tropical Storm Seven

A tropical storm developed rapidly just east of Hawaii on August 7. It moved westward into Hilo, where its circulation was greatly disrupted. A weakened depression persisted for 2 more days before dissipating. While weak, the storm caused very heavy flooding resulting in $500,000 in damage.  A private plane crashed near Hilo Airport on the 7th, killing the pilot and injuring the two passengers.

Tropical Storm Eight

Tropical Storm Eight existed from August 13 to August 14.

Hurricane Nine

Hurricane Nine existed from September 6 to September 13.

Tropical Storm Ten

In mid-September, a tropical storm moved up the Baja California coast.

Hurricane June

Typhoon June briefly crossed over the date line on September 20.

Hurricane Eleven

A hurricane moved northward through Baja California and Mexico and dissipated over New Mexico.

Tropical Storm Twelve

Tropical Storm Twelve existed from October 14 to October 17.

Tropical Storm Thirteen

On October 30 a tropical storm hit southwestern Mexico.

See also
List of Pacific hurricanes
1958 Pacific typhoon season
1958 Atlantic hurricane season
1950s South-West Indian Ocean cyclone seasons
1950s Australian region cyclone seasons
1950s South Pacific cyclone seasons

References